The 2010–11 Ukrainian Premier League Reserves season is a competition between the reserves of Ukrainian Premier League Clubs. The events in the senior leagues during the 2009–10 season saw Chornomorets Odesa Reserves and Zakarpattia Reserves all relegated and replaced by the promoted teams PFC Sevastapol Reserves and Volyn Lutsk Reserves.

Final standings

Top scorers
Last updated May 20, 2011

See also
2010–11 Ukrainian Premier League

References

Reserves
Ukrainian Premier Reserve League seasons